Phillip Moffitt (born 1946) is a vipassana (insight) meditation teacher, former publishing executive, author, and an instructor at Spirit Rock Meditation Center in Woodacre, California.

Biography 
Moffitt attended the University of Tennessee at Knoxville where in 1966 he helped found the Tennessee Intercollegiate State Legislature, an annual legislative session held by Tennessee college students. After graduating in 1971 with a M.S. in Economics, Moffitt co-founded 13-30 Corporation with Chris Whittle and served as editor-in-chief and president from 1974-1983. In 1979, 13-30 Corporation purchased Esquire magazine and Moffitt served as chief executive officer and editor-in-chief until 1987.

Deciding to begin a period of personal exploration that included studying mindfulness meditation and Theravada Buddhism, he sold Esquire to Hearst Magazines and left the publishing enterprise he created. In 2001, Moffitt was ordained to teach Vipassana meditation. His teaching is influenced by Ajahn Sumedho and his teacher Ajahn Chah. Moffitt is the founder of the Life Balance Institute, a non-profit organization dedicated to the study and practice of spiritual values in daily life. He also founded the Marin Sangha in San Rafael, California, and from 1998 until 2007 he was a contributing editor for Yoga Journal. Phillip is a member of the Guiding Teachers Council, and teaches regularly, at Spirit Rock Meditation Center in Woodacre, California.

He was identified by  Yoga Journal as one of the people who had "each, independently, discovered the benefits of merging mindfulness with asana", leading to "something we might call 'mindful yoga'."

Books 
Emotional Chaos to Clarity: How to Live More Skillfully, Make Better Decisions, and Find Purpose in Life 

Dancing with Life: Buddhist Insights for Finding Meaning and Joy in the Face of Suffering 

The Power to Heal: Ancient Arts & Modern Medicine with Rick Smolan and Matthew Naythons 

Medicine’s Great Journey: One Hundred Years of Healing with Rick Smolan 

Awakening through the Nine Bodies: Explorations in Consciousness for Mindfulness Meditation and Yoga Practitioners

Anthologies 
The Best Buddhist Writing, 2004, edited by Melvin McLeod 

The Best Buddhist Writing, 2009, edited by Melvin McLeod 

Will Yoga & Meditation Really Change My Life? Edited by Stephen Cope 

The Graywolf Annual Three: Essays, Memoirs & Reflections, Edited by Scott Walker

Articles 

"How Suffering Got A Bad Name," Huffington Post
"Living Skillfully: Knowing the Two Kinds of Desire," Huffington Post
"Practice Happiness," Yoga Journal, May 2008
"Decision Time," Body and Soul, February 2008
"Awakening in the Body," Shambhala Sun, September 2007
"Starting Over," Yoga Journal, February 2007
"The Tyranny of Expectations," Yoga Journal, Nov/Dec 2004
"The Heart’s Intention," Yoga Journal, Sep/Oct 2003
"The Yoga of Relationship," Yoga Journal, Jul/Aug 2003
"Living in an Age of Fear," Yoga Journal, Mar/Apr 2003
"Healing Your Mother Wound," Yoga Journal, Sep/Oct 2002
"Forgiving the Unforgivable," Yoga Journal, Jan/Feb 2002
"Violence Against Self," Yoga Journal, Mar/Apr, 2001
"The Language of the Soft Heart," Yoga Journal, Sep/Oct 2000
"Life Dancing," Yoga Journal, Jul/Aug 2000
"Disappointment is Hell," Yoga Journal, May/June 2000
"When $2 Million Isn’t Enough," Esquire, May 1989
"Cooling Out," Esquire, December 1986
"Everyman’s Xanadu," Esquire, April 1986
"The Dark Side of Excellence," Esquire, December 1985
"The Time of Your Life," Esquire, April 1985
"Does Anyone Know What Time it is?" Esquire, November 1984
"Why Men Grow Flowers," Esquire, October 1984
”Black Magic In Hindu Lineages in America” ‘ ‘  Hinduism Today’’, January 1994

See also
 Anne Cushman, who founded the first multi-year Buddhist meditation training for yoga teachers with Moffitt

References 

Living people
Theravada Buddhism writers
American Theravada Buddhists
Theravada Buddhist spiritual teachers
1946 births
Mindful Yoga
Yoga scholars